The 2012–13 season was the 53rd season in the history of NK Maribor and the club's 22nd consecutive season in the Slovenian PrvaLiga since the league establishment in 1991. The team participated in the Slovenian PrvaLiga, Slovenian Football Cup, UEFA Champions League, and UEFA Europa League. The season covers the period from 1 June 2012 to 31 May 2013. Darko Milanič was a head coach of the club.

Supercup

The 2012 Slovenian Supercup was the eighth edition of the Slovenian Supercup, an annual football match contested by the winners of the previous season's Slovenian PrvaLiga and Slovenian Cup competitions. However, Maribor has won the double during the 2011–12 season, having finished first in the 2011–12 Slovenian PrvaLiga and 2011–12 Slovenian Football Cup. As a consequence and according to the rules of the Football Association of Slovenia, they played the 2012 Supercup against the runners-up of the PrvaLiga, Olimpija. This was the first major domestic cup final of Olimpija, since the club was established in 2005. Maribor won the match 2–1 and secured their second supercup title.

Colour key: Green = Maribor win; Yellow = draw; Red = opponents win.

Slovenian League

Standings

Results summary

Results by round

Matches

Colour key: Green = Maribor win; Yellow = draw; Red = opponents win.

Notes
Note 1: The match was postponed to a later date due to bad pitch conditions.
Note 2: The match was postponed to a later date due to Maribor's UEFA Europa League campaign.
Note 3: All matches of the 25th round were postponed by one week due to snowfall. The match between Celje and Maribor was originally scheduled for 2 April 2013, but was postponed and rescheduled for 17 April 2013, once again due to snowfall.

Slovenian Cup

Colour key: Green = Maribor win; Yellow = draw; Red = opponents win.

Notes
Note 1: The match between Zavrč and Maribor was rescheduled from 19 September to 31 October, as Maribor played their first match of the 2012–13 UEFA Europa League on 20 September.
Note 2: The first leg of the quarter-finals match between Olimpija and Maribor was originally scheduled on 23 February 2013. However, after starting on schedule, the match was suspended in the 24th minute due to heavy snowfall. The match was then rescheduled for 27 February 2013, the date originally intended for the second leg match in Maribor.
Note 3: The first leg of the semi-finals were rescheduled from 10 April 2013 to 1 May 2013, due to rescheduling of the matches in the Slovenian PrvaLiga.
Note 4: The second leg of the semi-finals were rescheduled from 17 April 2013 to 8 May 2013, due to rescheduling of the matches in the Slovenian PrvaLiga.

European campaign

UEFA Champions League

Qualified as the 2012–13 Slovenian PrvaLiga champions, Maribor started their European campaign in the second qualifying round of the 2012–13 UEFA Champions League against Bosnian Premier League champions Željezničar. This was the first meeting in UEFA competitions between Maribor and a team from Bosnia and Herzegovina. The first leg was played at the Ljudski vrt stadium, the home of Maribor. The match started poorly for the home side as shortly after the missed scoring opportunity from Ibraimi, Maribor soon found themselves a goal behind when Adilović scored the opener in the 15th minute. Maribor then took control and tried to score an equalizer before half time, however, they were unsuccessful and the score was 1–0, in favour of the Bosnian side, at the 45 minute mark. Maribor dominated during the second half and was able to capitalize on their chances. Berić scored the first goal for the home side in the 47th minute, with Mezga adding the second one in the 67th, from penalty. Berić, who was man of the match, scored his second goal in the 76th minute, giving his side a 3–1 lead. He did not stop there as in the 90th minute he assisted team captain Tavares, who scored his first goal of the season, for the final score 4–1. The second leg was played a week later in Sarajevo and was followed by over 500 Maribor supporters. Željezničar plays their home matches at Grbavica Stadium, however, their stadium did not meet UEFA stadia criteria and they were forced to play at Asim Ferhatović Hase Olympic stadium. The home side needed a three goals victory to progress to the next round and had couple of chances to score early in the match, including a disallowed goal from Adilović who was in offside position. Their plans for an early lead were shattered, however, when Ibraimi scored from a long range effort in the 20th minute, which was the only goal during the first half. Second half started poorly for the Bosnians when Čolić received his second booking and was subsequently sent off. Željezničar bounced back in the 59th minute when Kvesić scored an equalizer. However, soon afterwards the nervous home players received two red cards in a matter of minutes and had to finish the match with only eight players. Maribor then prevailed, took the ball possession and finished the match with the goal from Tavares, for the final score of the match 2–1, and 6–2 aggregate.

In the third qualifying round, Maribor faced Dudelange from Luxembourg, a team which made a huge upset by eliminating the Austrian champions Salzburg. This was the second year in a row for Maribor to face Dudelange. During the 2011–12 season Maribor played against them in the second qualifying round of the 2011–12 UEFA Champions League and was successful with two victories and the score 5–1 aggregate. The first match against the Luxembourg champions was played on 1 August 2012 at Ljudski vrt. Being fully aware that a two-legged victory over Dudelange secures, at least, the UEFA Europa League group stages, Maribor players started their home match strong and quickly took the lead with a free kick goal by Mezga. Another free kick goal followed in the 38th minute when Mezga left the ball to Tavares who scored with a strong shot to the lower left corner, for the half-time score 2–0. It took only two minutes of the second half for the home players to score the third goal, when Mezga scored another long range effort from outside of the penalty box. In the 77th minute Berić continued his good form, having scored his third goal in as many 2012–13 UEFA qualifying matches. This goal was not the last, however, as Joachim took advantage of a mistake from Rajčević and scored in the 92nd minute for the final score 4–1. One week later Maribor again proved to strong for the Luxembourg champions and won 1–0, with the goal by Mertelj in the 79th minute. Similarly to the 2011–12 season Maribor again secured two victories over Dudelange, with the score 5–1 aggregate.

For the play-off round of the elite UEFA Champions League, Maribor was drawn together with Croatian champions Dinamo Zagreb. This was the second time the two clubs have met in the UEFA competitions, having faced each other during the 2003–04 UEFA Champions League qualifying stages, when Dinamo secured a close 2–1 aggregate victory. The first leg was played at Maksimir stadium in front of 20,135 spectators, over 1,000 of which were Maribor supporters, a record for the most fans gathered on Maribor's away matches. Dinamo were the favorites and took an early lead with a goal by Duje Čop. Dinamo continued to play well and had couple of more chances, but it was Maribor who scored the second goal, from an own goal scored by Dinamo's captain Milan Badelj. Both teams had chances to take the lead in the second half and in the 74th minut Badelj scored another goal. This time it was in the right net and Dinamo regained their lead. Shortly afterwards Maribor's Robert Berić had a good chance to equalize, but was unsuccessful. Right at the end, Sammir had a good chance to increase the lead of the home team, however, his free-kick attempt narrowly missed the target. The second leg in Maribor saw a turn out of 12,420 spectators, the most of the 2012–13 season, which were expecting a good result from the home side and the qualification to the Champions league for the first time in almost 10 years. The Croatians, however, proved again to be too strong and after taking another early lead, they comfortably held the positive result right until the very end, with couple of good chances to increase the lead. Dinamo thus won the second leg with an away 1–0 victory, aggregate 3–1, and advanced to the Champions league group stages for the second successive season. Even though, they were defeated, Maribor advanced to the group stages of the UEFA Europa League.

Second qualifying round 

Colour key: Green = Maribor win; Yellow = draw; Red = opponents win.

Third qualifying round 

Colour key: Green = Maribor win; Yellow = draw; Red = opponents win.

Play-off round 

Colour key: Green = Maribor win; Yellow = draw; Red = opponents win.

Notes
Note 1: Željezničar played their home match at Asim Ferhatović Hase Stadium in Sarajevo, as their own Grbavica Stadium did not meet UEFA criteria.

UEFA Europa League

Group J 

Colour key: Green = Maribor win; Yellow = draw; Red = opponents win.

Friendlies

Colour key: Green = Maribor win; Yellow = draw; Red = opponents win.

Squad statistics

Key

Players
No. = Shirt number
Pos. = Playing position
GK      = Goalkeeper
DF      = Defender
MF      = Midfielder
FW      = Forward

Nationality
 = Bosnia and Herzegovina
 = Brazil
 = Croatia
 = Macedonia
 = Serbia
 = Slovenia

Competitions
Apps    = Appearances
 = Yellow card
 = Red card

Appearances and goals
Correct as of 29 May 2013, end of the 2012–13 season. Flags indicate national team as has been defined under FIFA eligibility rules. Players may hold more than one non-FIFA nationality. The players squad numbers, playing positions, nationalities and statistics are based solely on match reports in Matches sections above and the official website of NK Maribor and the Slovenian PrvaLiga. Only the players, which made at least one appearance for the first team, are listed.

Discipline
Correct as of 29 May 2013, end of the 2012–13 season. Flags indicate national team as has been defined under FIFA eligibility rules. Players may hold more than one non-FIFA nationality. The players squad numbers, playing positions, nationalities and statistics are based solely on match reports in Matches sections above and the official website of NK Maribor and the Slovenian PrvaLiga. If a player received two yellow cards in a match and was subsequently sent off the numbers count as two yellow cards, one red card.

Transfers and loans

Summer transfer window

Winter transfer window

Footnotes
Knockout matches which were decided on penalty kicks are listed as a draw.
Olimpija was officially selected as the home team during the 2012 Slovenian Supercup, with a draw. The Slovenian Supercup is, however, traditionally played at the stadium of the previous year league champions and the 2012 final was played at the Ljudski vrt stadium in Maribor, the home of NK Maribor. Thus, the match is listed as being played at home.
Mezga holds a dual citizenship of Croatia and Slovenia.
Arghus holds a dual citizenship of Brazil and Italy.

See also
List of NK Maribor seasons

References

NK Maribor seasons
Maribor
Maribor
Maribor